Julie Rydahl Bukh (born 9 January 1982) is a Danish former football midfielder who most recently played for Brøndby IF and the Denmark national team. As well as teams in her native Denmark, Rydahl Bukh played for clubs in Sweden, Australia, and the United States. She was described by UEFA as a technically gifted and creative left-sided attacking midfielder.

Club career
Rydahl won six successive Elitedivisionen championships with Brøndby IF, before moving to Swedish club Linköpings FC alongside her girlfriend Cathrine Paaske in November 2008. She was recovering from a serious knee injury and did not play until March 2009. Rydahl and Paaske left three games before the end of Linköpings' championship-winning season for contracts with Sydney FC in the Australian W-League. Rydahl struck the winning goal in Sydney's 3–2 Grand Final win over Brisbane Roar.

After leaving Sydney FC, Rydahl and Paaske had expected to join the American Women's Professional Soccer (WPS) league, having signed contracts with Los Angeles Sol. When the Sol went into liquidation Rydahl returned to Denmark and joined Brøndby's sworn rivals Fortuna Hjørring instead. In January 2011, she rejoined Brøndby, after a short interlude with Pali Blues.

International career
In March 2001 Rydahl Bukh made her senior international debut against Finland. She scored her first goal in her second appearance, the Danes' 2–1 defeat to Italy in their opening group game at UEFA European Championship 2001.

Injury kept Rydahl Bukh out of UEFA European Championship 2005, but she returned to the team for the 2007 FIFA World Cup and the UEFA European Championship 2009.

She was named in national coach Kenneth Heiner-Møller's Denmark squad for UEFA European Championship 2013. In November 2013 Rydahl Bukh announced that she had retired from football.

Honours
With Brøndby IF:
 Elitedivisionen: 2003, 2004, 2005, 2006, 2007, 2008, 2011, 2012, 2013
 Danish Women's Cup: 2004, 2005, 2007, 2011, 2012, 2013

With Linköpings FC:
 Damallsvenskan: 2009
 Svenska Cupen: 2009

With Sydney FC:
 W-League Premiership: 2009
 W-League Championship: 2009

With Fortuna Hjørring:
 Elitedivisionen: 2010

References

External links
Danish Football Union (DBU) statistics

1982 births
Living people
Danish women's footballers
Pali Blues players
Sydney FC (A-League Women) players
Expatriate women's soccer players in Australia
Denmark women's international footballers
Expatriate footballers in Sweden
Fortuna Hjørring players
USL W-League (1995–2015) players
Linköpings FC players
Damallsvenskan players
Brøndby IF (women) players
Danish expatriates in Australia
2007 FIFA Women's World Cup players
Women's association football midfielders